Giulio Gerardi (30 November 1912 – 10 July 2001) was an Italian cross-country skier who competed in the 1930s.

At the 1936 Winter Olympics he was a member of the Italian relay team which finished fourth in the 4x10 km relay competition. In the 18 km event he finished 19th.

He won Bronze medals in the 4 x 10 km events of the FIS Nordic World Ski Championships 1937 and 1941.

Further notable results were:
 1934: 1st, Italian men's championships of cross-country skiing, 18 km
 1935: 2nd, Italian men's championships of cross-country skiing, 18 km
 1936: 1st, Italian men's championships of cross-country skiing, 18 km
 1940: 2nd, Italian men's championships of cross-country skiing, 18 km

External links

World Championship results 

1912 births
2001 deaths
Italian male cross-country skiers
Olympic cross-country skiers of Italy
Cross-country skiers at the 1936 Winter Olympics
FIS Nordic World Ski Championships medalists in cross-country skiing